Nevilton is a rural locality in the Toowoomba Region, Queensland, Australia. In the  Nevilton had a population of 33 people.

History 
The locality is believed to be named after the Neville family of Kenimore Farm in the district. William Neville operated the postal receiving office when it opened in 1901.

Headington Hill Provisional School opened on 11 May 1903. On 1 January 1909 it became Headington Hill State School. In 1910 it was renamed Nevilton State School. It closed in 1921, but reopened circa 1936. It closed permanently in 1958.

In the  Nevilton had a population of 33 people.

References 

Toowoomba Region
Localities in Queensland